Keoneʻae station (also known as UH-West Oahu station) is an under construction Honolulu Rail Transit station in East Kapolei, Hawaii, serving the University of Hawaiʻi – West Oʻahu. When finished, it will have 1000 park and ride spaces.

The Hawaiian Station Name Working Group proposed Hawaiian names for the nine rail stations on the Ewa end of the rail system (stations west of and including Aloha Stadium) in November 2017, and HART adopted the proposed names on February 22, 2018.

References

External links

Honolulu Rail Transit stations
Railway stations scheduled to open in 2023
Railway stations in the United States at university and college campuses